Sebastián Ágreda (1795 – 18 December 1875) was Bolivian military officer and statesman who served as the seventh president of Bolivia for 29 days in 1841. In addition to his short term as president, he also held a number of other governmental roles as well as being a prominent figure in the Bolivian military.

Early life and military career 
Ágreda was born in Potosí, Bolivia in 1795, from a very young age, he enlisted in the armies of General José de San Martín. He participated in the battles of Chacabuco and Maipú.

Ágreda had fought in the battles of Junin and Ayacucho under Antonio José de Sucre, for which the Grand Marshal rewarded him as commander of the Military College in Chuquisaca. Later still, he was appointed commander of the Army by Andrés de Santa Cruz, and was considered a national hero for heading the Bolivian forces that routed Argentina at the Battle of Montenegro in 1838.

Later, in the division of General Guillermo Miller, he fought in the battles of Junín and Ayacucho under the command of Antonio José de Sucre. In 1826 he was appointed by Sucre as second head of the Military College until 1828. He fought in the main battles of the campaigns of Marshal Andrés de Santa Cruz in Peru.

He was War Minister of Marshal Santa Cruz. Later he fought in the Battle of Montenegro. For his merits in this battle he was appointed Minister Plenipotentiary in Lima.

Presidency 
A loyal supporter of the Grand Marshal, in June 1841 General Ágreda succeeded in removing Gen. José Miguel de Velasco from power, installing himself as de facto ruler pending the return of Santa Cruz. He only controlled portions of the Army and, moreover, faced the opposition of the venerated members of Congress, with whom he had clashed since they insisted on naming one of their now to the post of Provisional President. 

After only a month in power, he agreed to leave provided Congress name a pro-Santa Cruz Provisional President until Santa Cruz himself could return to rule. This done, he left the Government Palace, and remained a respected war hero. Indeed, he became an elder statesman of sorts, serving as ambassador abroad and member of the Cabinet under José Ballivián, and Prefect of La Paz and Chuquisaca in his latter years (chiefly in the administrations of Jorge Córdova and José María Achá). He died at the age of 80 in La Paz.

References

1795 births
1875 deaths
19th-century Bolivian politicians
Achá administration cabinet members
Bolivian generals
Defense ministers of Bolivia
Leaders who took power by coup
People from Potosí
People of the Chilean War of Independence
People of the Peruvian War of Independence
People of the War of the Confederation
Presidents of Bolivia